Adam Miller (born 22 June 1984 in Sydney) is an Australian sprinter who competed at the Athens Olympics, 2006 Commonwealth Games and the 2007 IAAF World Championships.  He retired from running in 2008.

References

External links

Adam Miller

Living people
1984 births
Australian male sprinters
Australian Institute of Sport track and field athletes
Olympic athletes of Australia
Athletes (track and field) at the 2004 Summer Olympics
Athletes (track and field) at the 2006 Commonwealth Games
Commonwealth Games competitors for Australia